Willis P. Peguese (born December 18, 1966) is a former American football defensive end who played four seasons in the National Football League (NFL) with the Houston Oilers and Indianapolis Colts. He was drafted by the Oilers in the third round of the 1990 NFL Draft. He played college football at the University of Miami and attended Miami Southridge High School in Miami, Florida.

References

External links
Just Sports Stats

Living people
1966 births
Players of American football from Miami
American football defensive ends
Miami Hurricanes football players
Houston Oilers players
Indianapolis Colts players
Miami Southridge Senior High School alumni